Pasanauri (also spelled Passanauri) is a small town (daba) in Georgia, situated in the Dusheti district, Mtskheta-Mtianeti region.

Located on the Georgian Military Road, Pasanauri is flanked by the Aragvi River, and surrounded by the Caucasus Mountains. Average winter temperature is 0 degrees Celsius, but often falls below 10 degrees Celsius. As of the 2014 census, the townlet had a population of 1.148. 

Due to its picturesque location and the proximity to nearby historical sites as well as for its mineral water, hiking routes, handcrafted items and food, Pasanauri became a popular tourist destination in the Soviet period, but suffered decay during the years of post-Soviet crisis.

Climate

See also
 Mtskheta-Mtianeti

References

Populated places in Mtskheta-Mtianeti
Villages in Mtskheta-Mtianeti
Tiflis Governorate